Manas Robin (born 3 December 1976) is an Indian music director , singer , musician , lyricist , filmmaker , Bihu artist , and music producer .

Personal life

Childhood
Manas Robin was born to Mr. Rabindra Nath Gogoi and Mrs. Tilabala Dihingia on 03 December 1976. He did his early schooling at 233 No. Nimaijan Prathamik Vidyalaya (primary school). He did his matriculation from Sivasagar Government Higher Secondary School. After that, he went to Jagannath Barooah College, Jorhat for further education.

Career

In 1995 his first solo album Niharika under the banner of Music Makers was released. It was followed by Ujan Piriti in 1997 under Typhoon Production, Manas Kanya and Barasha under Saraswati Communications in 1999. He has been the youngest director to score music for an Assamese film in 1999 when he composed music for Priya O’ Priya. He has, since then done music direction for over 20 Assamese feature films. 

He has directed music for over 500 music albums in Assamese and other languages of the northeast. He has also produced and directed several VCD films in Assamese, including Jonbai, and directed audio albums for singer Dr. Bhupen Hazarika, Zubeen Garg, and many others.

Discography

As a music director

Achievements

References
 
 [https://www.ndtv.com/india-news/filmfare-awards-2020-in-guwahati-for-filmfare-awards-bollywood-greeted-with-anti-caa-appeal-2181070
 [https://www.timesofassam.com/entertainment/manas-robin-beyond-the-musical-frontiers/
 Manas Robin Beyond the Musical Frontiers. timesofassam.com.
 northeastnews.in
 City. Assam Tribune. 16 January 2014.
 City. Assam Tribune. 4 January 2014.
 [https://www.youtube.com/user/manasrobin
 [https://www.instagram.com/manas_robin/
 [https://twitter.com/manasrobin

1976 births
Musicians from Assam
People from Sivasagar
Living people
Singers from Assam
Assamese playback singers
Assamese-language singers
21st-century Indian male singers
21st-century Indian singers
Indian male singer-songwriters
Indian male pop singers
Indian male composers
Indian pop composers